Pakistan competed at the 2017 Asian Indoor and Martial Arts Games held in Ashgabat, Turkmenistan from September 17 to 27. 107 athletes competed in 11 different sports.

Participants

Medallists

Multiple medallists
The following competitors won several medals at the 2017 Asian Indoor and Martial Arts Games.

References 

Nations at the 2017 Asian Indoor and Martial Arts Games
2017 in Pakistani sport